This list of UTEP people includes graduates, non-graduate former students, and current students of University of Texas at El Paso and its graduate programs.

Coaches 

 Keitha Adams (born 1967), basketball coach.
 Don Haskins (1930-2008), basketball coach.
 Sandra Rushing, basketball coach.

Faculty

 Renato Aguilera, professor of biological sciences
Zuill Bailey, professor of cello, professional cellist
Steven Best, professor of philosophy and co-founder of the North American Animal Liberation Press Office
 Andy Cohen, Major League Baseball second baseman who coached university team for 17 years
Jorge Gardea-Torresdey, chemistry professor and nanoparticle researcher
Laurie Ann Guerrero, writer and Texas Poet Laureate
John Haddox, philosopher and Latin-Americanist
Anna Jaquez, art professor 
Jorge López, physics professor and educator
Urbici Soler y Manonelles, Spanish sculptor
Diana Natalicio (born 1939), first woman to serve as president of UTEP.
Denis O'Hearn, professor of sociology and anthropology.
Benjamin Alire Sáenz, writer
Ellwyn R. Stoddard, Professor Emeritus of Sociology and Anthropology
Myra Carroll Winkler (1880-1963), second woman to serve as faculty at UTEP.

Alumni
F. Murray Abraham – Academy Award Best Actor winner, Amadeus
Nate Archibald – NBA Hall of Famer, chosen as one of the Top 50 Greatest NBA Players
Bob Beamon – Olympic gold medalist, world record holder in track and field
Sam Donaldson – ABC News veteran and former White House Chief Correspondent
Jon Dorenbos – Buffalo Bills, Philadelphia Eagles former long snapper
Eleanor Lyon Duke – biology professor
Dave Feitl – former NBA player
Tevita Fifita – professional wrestler
Greg Foster – former NBA player and one time NBA champion with the Los Angeles Lakers
Hector Guerrero – professional wrestler, performed on WWF and NWA
Vickie Guerrero – General Manager of WWE Smackdown
Jack Handey – American humorist, Saturday Night Live
Wayne Hansen – former NFL player
Tim Hardaway – NBA All-Star, 2000 Summer Olympics gold medalist
Idris Haron – Chief Minister of Malacca, Malaysia
William D. Hawkins – U.S. Marine awarded the Medal of Honor posthumously during World War II
Kjell Ove Hauge - Norwegian former track-athlete, since Head master at Kuben Upper Secondary School
J. P. Hayes – professional golfer
Johnnie Lee Higgins – National Football League wide receiver and return specialist, Conference USA Special Teams Player of the Year in 2006.
Ed Hochuli – National Football League referee
Thomas Howard – former NFL linebacker
Suzanna Hupp – former Republican state representative and gun rights advocate
Chris Jacke – BBA 1989, All-American place kicker, Super Bowl champion with Green Bay Packers
Shoshana Johnson – U.S. Army Specialist, former Iraq POW
Aaron Jones – Green Bay Packers running back
Seth Joyner – 1991 NFL Defensive Player of the Year by Sports Illustrated, one-time Super Bowl champion
Ginger Kerrick – American physicist and first Hispanic female NASA Flight Director at NASA's Lyndon B. Johnson Space Center
Mia Khalifa – former pornographic actress, social media personality, webcam model
Mike Maddux – former Major League Baseball pitcher
Yossi Maiman – Israeli businessman
Karla Martinez – host of popular morning show Despierta America
Don Maynard – Pro Football Hall of Fame
McKenzie Moore - player in the Israeli Basketball Premier League
Paul Moreno – former Texas Democratic State Representative, longest serving Mexican American elected official in the United States
Halakilangi Muagututia – American football player
Brian Natkin – former NFL tight end and unanimous college All-American
Blessing Okagbare – Olympic and world medalist in the long jump
John D. Olivas – first UTEP alumnus to be selected as an astronaut by NASA, member of Space Shuttle Mission STS-117 crew aboard the Atlantis
Bob O'Rear – one of the earliest employees of Microsoft
Claudia Ordaz Perez – member of the Texas House of Representatives (2021-Present)
Estela Portillo-Trambley – poet
John Rayborn – gridiron football player
Nolan Richardson – former NCAA champion collegiate men's basketball head coach at the University of Arkansas
Rubén Salazar – Mexican-American journalist
Paul Smith – former NFL player
W. E. "Pete" Snelson – journalist, businessman, and member of both houses of the Texas State Legislature from Midland, later worked in Austin as an educational consultant
Charles A. Steen – geologist whose Mi Vida Mine discovery started the American Uranium Boom of the 1950s
Billy Stevens – former Green Bay Packers quarterback
Obadele Thompson – former 100 meters world record holder
Kayla Thornton – forward for the Dallas Wings
Tony Tolbert – three-time world champion with the Dallas Cowboys
Susana Martinez – incumbent governor of New Mexico
Riley Matheson – former NFL player
Bob Wallace – former Chicago Bears tight end
Marvin Washington – former NFL player
Charlie West – former NFL player
Jesse Whittenton – former NFL player
Robert Windham – professional wrestler, performing as Blackjack Mulligan, and patriarch of a prominent wrestling family.
Richard Crawford White – politician, served in the Texas House of Representatives from 1955 to 1959 and in the U.S. House of Representatives from 1965 to 1983.
Jesse Whittenton – Green Bay Packers Hall of Fame
Barron Wortham – former NFL player
Brian Young – former NFL player

References

University of Texas at El Paso people